Corticeus fasciatus is a species of beetle belonging to the family Tenebrionidae.

References

Tenebrionidae